Willem "Wil" Albeda (13 June 1925 – 6 May 2014) was a Dutch politician of the defunct Anti-Revolutionary Party (ARP) and later of the Christian Democratic Appeal (CDA) party and economist.

Albeda attended a gymnasium in Leeuwarden from May 1937 until March 1943. During the German occupation Albeda wanted to continue his study but in March 1943 he refused to sign a loyalty oath to the German occupation authority but to escape prosecution he was forced to enlist in the Arbeitslager in the German armored production industry in Oberhausen. Following the end of World War II Albeda served as a translator for the United States Army from March 1945 until May 1945. Albeda worked as a civil servant for the Fiscal Information and Investigation Service (FIOD) of the Ministry of Finance from May 1945 until June 1945 and for the Central Bank of the Netherlands from June 1945 until November 1945. Albeda applied at the Rotterdam School of Economics in April 1946 majoring in Economics obtaining a Bachelor of Economics degree in June 1947 before graduating with a Master of Economics degree on 8 December 1950. Albeda worked as a researcher at the Netherlands Economic Institute from April 1948 until September 1951. Albeda worked a financial adviser for the National Christian Trade unions (CNV) from September 1951 until January 1960. Albeda applied at the Free University Amsterdam in July 1952 for a postgraduate education in Development economics and got an doctorate as an Doctor of Philosophy in Development economics on 22 February 1957. Albeda worked as a researcher for Philips from January 1960 until November 1961. Albeda worked as a trade union leader for the National Christian Trade unions and served as General-Secretary from November 1961 until September 1966. Albeda worked as a professor of Development economics at the Rotterdam School of Economics from September 1966 until December 1977 and as a professor of Labour law at the Rotterdam School of Economics from January 1973 until December 1977 and as a professor of Labour law and Public administration at the Delft Institute of Technology from February 1973 until December 1977.

Albeda was elected as a Member of the Senate after the Senate election of 1960, taking office on 20 September 1966 serving as a frontbencher chairing the parliamentary committee for General Affairs and parliamentary committee for Economic Affairs and spokesperson for Economic Affairs, Social Affairs, Development Cooperation and Development aid. Albeda was selected as Parliamentary leader of the Anti-Revolutionary Party in the Senate following the appointed of Gaius de Gaay Fortman as Minister of the Interior in the Cabinet Den Uyl, taking office on 11 May 1973. After the election of 1977 Albeda was appointed as Minister of Social Affairs in the Cabinet Van Agt–Wiegel, taking office on 19 December 1977. In April 1981 Albeda announced that he wouldn't stand for the election of 1981 but wanted tot return to the Senate. After the Senate election of 1981 Albeda returned as a Member of the Senate, taking office on 30 June 1981. Following the cabinet formation of 1981 Boersma was not giving a cabinet post in the new cabinet, the Cabinet Van Agt-Wiegel was replaced by the Cabinet Van Agt II on 11 September 1981 and he continued to serve in the Senate as a frontbencher and spokesperson for Economic Affairs and Social Affairs and deputy spokesperson for Finances.

Albeda became a distinguished professor of Economics at the Utrecht University, serving from 1 November 1981 until 1 January 1985 and also returned as a Member of the Social and Economic Council, serving from 1 December 1981 until 1 January 1985. In December 1984 Albeda was nominated as Director of the Scientific Council for Government Policy, serving from 1 January 1985 until 1 January 1990.

The Rotterdam-based Albeda College is named after him

Decorations

References

External links

  Dr. W. (Wil) Albeda Parlement & Politiek
  Dr. W. Albeda (CDA) Eerste Kamer der Staten-Generaal

 

1925 births
2014 deaths
Anti-Revolutionary Party politicians
Christian Democratic Appeal politicians
Dutch development economists
Directors of the Scientific Council for Government Policy
Dutch academic administrators
Dutch expatriates in Germany
Dutch financial writers
Dutch nonprofit directors
Dutch World War II forced labourers
Dutch trade union leaders
Erasmus University Rotterdam alumni
Academic staff of Erasmus University Rotterdam
Grand Officers of the Order of Leopold II
Grand Officers of the Order of Orange-Nassau
Knights Commander of the Order of Merit of the Federal Republic of Germany
Knights of the Order of the Netherlands Lion
Academic staff of Maastricht University
Members of the Senate (Netherlands)
Members of the Social and Economic Council
Ministers of Social Affairs of the Netherlands
Politicians from Rotterdam
Politicians from Maastricht
Public economists
Protestant Church Christians from the Netherlands
Reformed Churches Christians from the Netherlands
Academic staff of Utrecht University
Vrije Universiteit Amsterdam alumni
20th-century Dutch economists
20th-century Dutch male writers
20th-century Dutch politicians
United States Army personnel of World War II
United States Army civilians